Mar Ignatius Gregory Simon II Zora, born Rabban Hindi (1754–1838), was the Patriarch of the Syriac Catholic Church from 1814 to 1817.

Life 
Simon Zora converted to the Syriac Catholic Church in 1804 from Syrian Orthodox Church and in 1812 was appointed archbishop of Damascus.
After the resignation of Ignatius Michael IV Daher, accepted by Pope Pius VII only in 1812, Simon Zora was elected Patriarch on January 13, 1814 and confirmed by Rome on March 8, 1816. His patriarchate was particularly troubled because of quarrels among the bishops. Simon Zora collided with both the former patriarch Michel Daher, now bishop of Aleppo, and with the bishop of Jerusalem, Peter Jarweh. Because of these troubles, Simon Zora resigned on May 23, 1817, and his resignation were accepted by Propaganda Fide on June 1, 1818.

After Simon Zora resignation, the Vatican appointed as Patriarchal Vicar the bishop of Aleppo, Denys Michel Hadaja (who died on 6 January 1827).

Notes

External links
 http://www.catholic-hierarchy.org/bishop/bzor.html

Syriac Catholic Patriarchs of Antioch
Converts to Eastern Catholicism from Oriental Orthodoxy
1754 births
1838 deaths
18th-century people from the Ottoman Empire
19th-century people from the Ottoman Empire
19th-century Eastern Catholic archbishops
Bishops in the Ottoman Empire